The Sunrisers Hyderabad (often abbreviated as SRH) are a franchise cricket team based in Hyderabad, Telangana, which plays in the Indian Premier League (IPL). They were one of the eight teams to compete in the 2021 Indian Premier League, making their ninth appearance in all IPL tournaments. The team was coached by Trevor Bayliss with Brad Haddin as assistant coach, Muttiah Muralitharan as bowling coach and VVS Laxman as mentor.

They began the season with a loss against the Kolkata Knight Riders and failed to qualify for the playoffs finishing eighth at the end of the tournament.

Background
On 15 December 2020, Tom Moody was appointed as the Director of Cricket for Sunrisers Hyderabad. He coached the Sunrisers since its inception in 2013 until the end of 2019 season. The Sunrisers won their only IPL title in 2016 under his charge.

Player acquisition

The Sunrisers Hyderabad retained 22 players and released five players as they announced their retention list on 20 January 2021 ahead of the auction.

The players' auction took place on 18 February 2021 in Chennai. The Sunrisers acquired services of two domestic players and an overseas player.

Retained players David Warner, Manish Pandey, Kane Williamson, Jonny Bairstow, Wriddhiman Saha, Shreevats Goswami, Priyam Garg, Virat Singh, Rashid Khan, Vijay Shankar, Mohammad Nabi, Abhishek Sharma, Mitchell Marsh, Jason Holder, Abdul Samad, Thangarasu Natarajan, Bhuvneshwar Kumar, Shahbaz Nadeem, Khaleel Ahmed, Siddarth Kaul, Sandeep Sharma, Basil Thampi

Released players Sanjay Yadav, Bavanaka Sandeep, Billy Stanlake, Fabian Allen, Prithvi Raj

Added players Jagadeesha Suchith, Kedar Jadhav, Mujeeb Ur Rahman

Replacement players Jason Roy, Sherfane Rutherford, Umran Malik

Squad 
 Players with international caps are listed in bold.
 Year signed denotes the season the player first played for the side

Administration and support staff

Kit manufacturers and sponsors

Season overview

League stage

Standings

Results by match

Fixtures

League stage

Statistics

Awards and achievements

Awards
Man of the Match

Achievements
 Mohammad Nabi became the first player in the IPL history to take five catches in a single match.

Reaction
Trevor Bayliss and Brad Haddin stepped down as the head-coach and assistant coach of the Sunrisers Hyderabad following the last-place finish. VVS Laxman stepped down as mentor to take the job as the Director of Cricket at the National Cricket Academy. On December 23 2021, Tom Moody, predecessor to Bayliss, was announced as the head-coach of the Sunrisers Hyderabad for the 2022 Indian Premier League with Simon Katich appointed as the assistant-coach. Dale Steyn, Brian Lara and Hemang Badani were also appointed as pace-bowling, batting and fielding coaches.

Notes

Footnotes

References

External links
Sunrisers Hyderabad official website

2021 Indian Premier League
Sunrisers Hyderabad seasons